Alessandra Neri (born 10 April 1988) is an Italian racing driver currently competing in the TCR International Series. She previously competed in the International GTSprint Series, Italian GT Championship & Formula Azzurra amongst others.

Racing career
Neri began her career in 1997 in Karting, she raced there for many seasons up until 2005. In 2006, she switched to the Italian Formula Azzurra Championship, she raced there up until 2007, finishing 8th in the championship standings that year. She switched to the Endurance GT Series for 2008. She made a one-off appearance in the Spanish GT Championship, while also racing in the Italian GT Championship in 2009. For 2010 she switched to the International GTSprint Series championship, finishing 2nd in the GTCup class standings in 2010 and 3rd in 2011. She made a one-off appearance in the 2011 Trofeo Maserati Europe series. In 2012, she returned to the Italian GT Championship, finishing 19th in the championship standings.

In May 2016 it was announced that she would race in the TCR International Series, driving a SEAT León Cup Racer for B.D. Racing.

Racing record

Complete TCR International Series results
(key) (Races in bold indicate pole position) (Races in italics indicate fastest lap)

References

External links 

 
 

1988 births
Living people
TCR International Series drivers
Italian racing drivers
Italian female racing drivers